Diane Sinclair (born Miriam Rosen; April 6, 1921 – May 14, 2011) was an American actress and dancer from 1939 through the 1950s.

Early life
Born in Brooklyn, New York, Sinclair was the daughter of Max Rosen and Sylvia Morrison Rosen, who met as actors in amateur plays.

As a child, she performed on the Horn and Hardart Children's hour radio show and danced in shows at summer resorts in the Catskills.

Career
Sinclair began her Broadway career at age 18 in 1939. She danced and acted in many Broadway shows and tours, including starring as Ariel in The Tempest on tour (1945), and was featured with Gene Kelly in Pal Joey on Broadway (1940–41). 

Her Broadway credits include Happy as Larry as Lachesis (1950); As the Girls Go as Miss Swenson (1948–50); Sons o' Fun as Little Nell and Ensemble (1941–43) and Too Many Girls (1939–40).

Television

Sinclair became a regular on the TV variety shows of the 1950s, usually starring with longtime dance partner Ken Spaulding. She was a regular on The Dave Garroway Show from 1953–54, and made a number of appearances on The Ed Sullivan Show. She also danced on the Jack Paar and Paul Winchell shows. Life Magazine pictured her on its cover on January 25, 1954.

Marriage

She met Sol Tepper, an orchestra musician, while performing in Billy Rose's Aquacade at the 1939 New York World's Fair. They married on July 28, 1942; the couple had one child, a son, Ronald Tepper (born July 29, 1943-died January 18, 2018).

Later life
After retiring from performing, Sinclair had several successful careers, including casting for television, floral design, and as a travel agent. In her late 60s, she began doing portrait sculpture, both in-the-round and bas-relief, one of which hangs in the lobby of the Players' Club in Manhattan. 

She died in Elmhurst, New York in 2011, aged 90.

References

External links
 
 https://web.archive.org/web/20071223083457/http://www.museum.tv/archives/etv/G/htmlG/garrowayatl/garrowayatl.htm

1921 births
2011 deaths
American stage actresses
American female dancers
Dancers from New York (state)
20th-century American actresses
Jewish American actresses
Actresses from New York City
People from Brooklyn
21st-century American Jews
21st-century American women